James Elias (born 4 December 1993) is a Lebanon international rugby league footballer.

Form Corlette, New South Wales, Elias is a youth worker and teacher aid. He played in the NSW Cup for three seasons for the Newcastle Knights. Elias played for Western Suburbs Rosellas for two seasons (in 2017 and 2018) before leaving to pursue a career in policing.

References

External links
2017 RLWC profile

Living people
1993 births
Australian rugby league players
Australian people of Lebanese descent
Sportspeople of Lebanese descent
Lebanon national rugby league team players
Western Suburbs Rosellas players
Rugby league centres
Rugby league second-rows